Deborah Jay (born 24 October 1961) is a British diver. She competed in the women's 3 metre springboard event at the 1980 Summer Olympics.

References

1961 births
Living people
British female divers
Olympic divers of Great Britain
Divers at the 1980 Summer Olympics
Place of birth missing (living people)